Roy Jansen (born 6 May 1950) is a Norwegian ice hockey player. He was born in Oslo, Norway and represented the clubs IL Sparta and Vålerengens IF. He played for the Norwegian national ice hockey team, and participated at the Winter Olympics in Sapporo in 1972, where the Norwegian team placed 8th.

References 

1950 births
Living people
Ice hockey people from Oslo
Ice hockey players at the 1972 Winter Olympics
Norwegian ice hockey players
Olympic ice hockey players of Norway
Vålerenga Ishockey players